The 1988 NBL Finals was the championship series of the 1988 season of Australia's National Basketball League (NBL) and the conclusion of the season's playoffs. The Canberra Cannons defeated the North Melbourne Giants in three games (2-1) for their third NBL championship.

Format
The 1988 National Basketball League Finals started on 14 July and concluded on 7 August. The playoffs consisted of two knockout Quarter finals, two best  of three Semi-finals and the best of three game Grand Final series. As the two top teams at the end of the regular season, the Adelaide 36ers and North Melbourne Giants both qualified for home court advantage during the Semi-finals.

The finals series were played earlier than usual due to the 1988 Summer Olympic Games which were held at the time the NBL normally held their finals (September–October).

Qualification

Qualified teams

Ladder

Quarter finals

(3) Canberra Cannons vs (6) Newcastle Falcons

(4) Brisbane Bullets vs (5) Perth Wildcats

Semi-finals

(1) Adelaide 36ers vs (3) Canberra Cannons

Game 1

Game 2

(2) North Melbourne Giants vs (5) Perth Wildcats

Game 1

Game 2

Game 3

Grand Final series

(2) North Melbourne Giants vs (3) Canberra Cannons

Game 1

Game 2

Game 3

See also
 1988 NBL season

References

Finals
National Basketball League (Australia) Finals